Bowers Canyon is an undersea canyon west of Iselin Bank in the Ross Sea. It was named in association with Bowers Glacier by the Advisory Committee for Undersea Features in April 1980.

References
 

Canyons and gorges of Antarctica
Landforms of Victoria Land